Jason Eady is an American singer and guitarist, originally from Mississippi but now based in Texas. He is affiliated with the Texas country music scene, particularly through his evocation of an "old school honky-tonk" style of songwriting.

Biography
Jason Eady grew up in Jackson, Mississippi, and has been influenced by bluegrass, Don Williams and Willie Nelson. He is married to, and frequently collaborates with, Texas singer-songwriter Courtney Patton.

Eady collaborated with Kevin Welch on his last three albums, AM Country Heaven from 2012, Daylight and Dark from 2014, and his self-titled album from 2017. AM Country Heaven debuted at number 40 on the Billboard Top Country Albums chart and number 9 on the Top Heatseekers chart.

Highway Prayer: A Tribute to Adam Carroll, released on Austin-based Eight 30 Records in late 2016, featured Eady's take on Carroll's "Errol's Song." Additionally, Eight 30 Records' Floater: A Tribute to the Tributes to Gary Floater featured Eady's version of "Stand Back Boys I'm Fixing to Care.

Reviews
AllMusic gave Daylight and Dark a 4 star review and said, "In terms of quality, it belongs on a shelf next to Dwight Yoakam's Buenas Noches from a Lonely Room, Joe Ely's Letter to Laredo, and yes, even Willie Nelson's Phases and Stages". NPR's Ken Tucker contrasted Eady's traditionalism with Jon Pardi and said, "Ultimately, both Pardi and Eady have to confront the dilemma of all young country musicians: how to navigate the pop current that keeps country music commercially viable while connecting to a past that fewer and fewer listeners are aware of."

Discography

Studio albums

References

External links
 Jason Eady official website

Living people
Musicians from Jackson, Mississippi
American country singer-songwriters
American male singer-songwriters
Singer-songwriters from Mississippi
Country musicians from Mississippi
Year of birth missing (living people)